Anti-Thai sentiment involves hostility or hatred that is directed towards people in Thailand (usually referring to Thai Chinese and Siamese), or the state of Thailand.

Incidents by country

Cambodia 

The hatred toward Thais in Cambodia had existed since the late Khmer Empire. Siamese forces under the Ayutthaya Kingdom had overrun the Khmer Empire many times, leaving a big scar over Cambodia. Siam historically occupied Cambodia, turning Cambodians against Thais.

Anti-Thai sentiment began to flare in Cambodia because of Cambodians' fear of Thai designs on western Cambodia. That led to a violent protest in January 2003 in which the Thai embassy was burned and Thai businesses were vandalised after a Cambodian newspaper article falsely alleged that a Thai actress had claimed that Angkor Wat belonged to Thailand and that it should take over the ancient temple. The hatred towards Thai people from the Cambodians would escalate in 2008, when both countries were involved in the conflict on the ownership of Preah Vihear Temple.

China 
Animosity towards the Thai in China 1934 caused by forced assimilation Chinese people in country by Thai authorities. Some of the Chinese who had been deported from Thailand began to spread anti-Thai sentiment in China and called for an immediate boycott from the Chinese authorities to all products that been imported from Thailand.

Laos 
Since ancient times, Laos has been against Siamese territorial expansions although both shared the similar religion and there was even a request from Laotians to the French colonial authorities for a recovery of lost territory on the Khorat Plateau and of the Emerald Buddha from Siam. After achieving independence under communism, the present Laos government are much more sympathetic to Vietnam, and there is a rejection from Laotians towards Thailand, which is currently somewhat between a democracy and an autocracy.

Myanmar 
Both nations shared the same religion and were involved in several wars in the past. In the present, there is more anti-Myanmar sentiment in Thailand than anti-Thai sentiment in Myanmar, as is shown by the publications of Thai school textbooks, films and media reports. The Myanmar government does not regard Thailand as its main enemy but does not consider Thailand as a "trusted friend" either.

See also 
 Racism in Thailand

References 

Foreign relations of Thailand
Thai
Racism
Thai